Joséphine Thérèse Koster (23 June 1902–22 June 1986) was a botanist.  

She named many plants in the genera Piora, Vernonia, and others, 
using the
J.Kost. abbreviation.

References

External links

1902 births
1986 deaths
Botanists